Power Matters Alliance (PMA) was a global, not-for-profit, industry organization whose mission was to advance a suite of standards and protocols for wireless power transfer for mobile electronic devices (specifically a type of inductive charging that competes with the Qi standard). The organization was merged with Alliance for Wireless Power (A4WP) in 2015 to form AirFuel Alliance.

Founded by Procter & Gamble and Powermat Technologies in March 2012, PMA was networking technology companies in order to guarantee consumers interoperable devices which employed wireless power technology. Marked by the electron "P", PMA interface standard described analog power transfer (inductive and resonant), digital transceiver communication, cloud based power management, and environmental sustainability. The PMA board of directors included representatives from AT&T, Duracell, Starbucks, Powermat Technologies, Flextronics, Federal Communications Commission (FCC), and Energy Star. The membership of the PMA was made up of companies across the mobile device ecosystem, including handset providers, service providers, chipset suppliers, manufacturers, test labs and public establishments.

PMA standard and technology 
The PMA's stated mission was to formulate and advance a suite of interface standards for smart and energy-efficient transfer of wireless power. The PMA was actively publishing a suite of standards based on inductive coupling technology to provide advanced inductive and resonant power. In addition, the PMA sought to add a digital layer providing policy-setting, monitoring, and extensible APIs. The PMA managed interoperability, certification and logo programs according to these specifications.

On February 11, 2014, the Alliance for Wireless Power (A4WP) and the PMA announced that they signed an agreement calling for the following immediate next steps:

 PMA adopts the A4WP Rezence specification as the PMA magnetic resonance charging specification for both transmitters and receivers in both single and multi-mode configurations
 A4WP adopts the PMA inductive specification as a supported option for multi-mode inductive, magnetic resonance implementations
 A4WP to collaborate with PMA on their open network API for network services management

This agreement was a move toward industry consolidation of wireless charging standards. The two organisations went a step further in 2015, by announcing their intent to merge into a new organisation., named the AirFuel Alliance.

Key Features 
 Inductive Coupling
 Digital Transceiver Communication
 Cloud Based Power Management
 PRU Category 1-7. PTU Class 1-6
 PRX Out Max from 3.5W to 50W (Cat. 1 TBD)
 PTX Input Max from 2W to 70W

Mark of Interoperability 
The 'Electron P' mark of interoperability was required to set compatibility standards across markets and industry, and across all links in the delivery chain of the alliance. It was used by industries and companies that adopt and implement the PMA standards. It was displayed at coffee shops, clubs, hair salons, airline terminals, entertainment venues, and on mobile phone accessories.

Semi-Annual Conferences and Quarterly PlugFests 
PMA conducted member conferences.

Working Groups

Adoption 
On June 11, 2014, Starbucks announced plans to provide wireless chargers at its coffeehouses in the United States and to test the wireless chargers in select European and Asian markets.

See also
 Qi, a competing wireless power standard promoted by Wireless Power Consortium
 Rezence, a cooperative wireless power standard promoted by the A4WP
 Open Dots, a competing wireless power standard promoted by Open Dots Alliance

References

External links

  – official site of a wireless power standard promoted by the Alliance for Wireless Power
  – official site of a wireless power standard promoted by the Wireless Power Consortium

Networking standards
Wireless
Wireless energy transfer